Fantasia Monique Barrino-Taylor (born June 30, 1984), known professionally by her mononym Fantasia, is an American R&B singer and actress. She rose to prominence in 2004 for her performance of the Porgy and Bess standard "Summertime" during the third season of the reality television series American Idol, and eventually became that season's winner. Following her victory, Barrino became the second female artist after Lauryn Hill to have their first single debut at number-one on the Billboard Hot 100, when her debut single "I Believe", launched atop the chart.

Her debut album Free Yourself (2004), went on to be certified Platinum by the Recording Industry Association of America (RIAA), and garnered her three nominations at the 48th Annual Grammy Awards. In 2006, Barrino released her second album, Fantasia, which featured the single "When I See U", which topped the Billboard Hot R&B/Hip-Hop Songs chart for eight weeks. Her third studio album Back to Me (2010), spawned the hit single "Bittersweet", which won her a Grammy Award for Best Female R&B Vocal Performance. Barrino's fourth album Side Effects of You (2013), debuted at number-two on the Billboard 200, and included the song "Lose to Win".

Outside of music, she released her autobiography Life Is Not a Fairy Tale (2006), which landed on the New York Times Best Seller list. The autobiography was later adapted into the Debbie Allen-directed Lifetime television film Life Is Not a Fairy Tale: The Fantasia Barrino Story, starring Barrino alongside Viola Davis. Barrino then played the part of Celie in the Broadway musical The Color Purple (2007-2008), for which she won a Theatre World Award in 2007. In November 2013, Barrino returned to Broadway in the musical After Midnight. She is set to reprise the role of Celie in the 2023 film adaptation of The Color Purple.

Barrino has been referred as "The Queen of Rock Soul". In 2012, VH1 ranked her number 32 on their list of the 100 Greatest Women in Music. She has also been inducted into the North Carolina Music Hall of Fame.

Early life 
Barrino was born to Diane and Joseph Barrino and raised in High Point, North Carolina. She began singing at the age of five. R&B duo K-Ci & JoJo are her first cousins. Her uncles, The Barrino Brothers, were a 1970s R&B band.

Despite the travels, she attended Andrews High School in High Point, North Carolina. Feeling embarrassed and harassed after she was raped by a classmate, she dropped out of high school. She became pregnant at 16, and on August 8, 2001, she gave birth to a daughter with her ex-boyfriend Brandel Shouse.

Career

2004–2005: American Idol and Free Yourself 
Barrino's show was a staging of the Porgy and Bess standard "Summertime" that left her in tears from "feeling the song" and earned praise from the judges and was named amongst the AOL's 2004 list of greatest television moments.

For the final performance of the season, Barrino offered a second performance of "Summertime" that again drew praise from the judges; Simon Cowell remarked that she was the best contestant to ever compete in any competition, including the more than seventy Idol champions crowned nationally and internationally since the show began its first global incarnations. On the finale, over 65 million votes were cast to determine the winner on May 26, 2004, up from 24 million in 2003. Barrino defeated runner-up Diana DeGarmo by 1.3 million votes. At age 19, she was the youngest American Idol winner until May 23, 2007, when then 17-year-old Jordin Sparks won the title.

Barrino participated in the U.S. tour with the other American Idol finalists, and appeared in the 2004 Christmas special, Kelly, Ruben and Fantasia: Home for the Holidays as well.

Barrino's brother auditioned for the eighth season of American idol but failed to make it to the Hollywood round.

Performances 

: When Ryan Seacrest announced the results in the particular night, Barrino was in the bottom two, but declared safe when LaToya London was eliminated.

After winning American Idol, Barrino signed to J Records with 19 Entertainment and began work on her debut album. In June 2004, she released her debut single, "I Believe", which later debuted at number one on the Billboard Hot 100. This number-one debut made Barrino the first artist in history to achieve this with a first single. On the sales chart, the single spent eleven consecutive weeks at number one, giving it the longest consecutive stay on top of that chart for an American Idol contestant. The CD single, "I Believe", went on to become the top selling single of 2004 in the U.S., and has since been certified double platinum by the CRIA. She also won three Billboard Music Awards for the single.

Barrino released her debut studio album, Free Yourself, in November 2004. It debuted at number eight on the Billboard 200, selling 240,000 copies in its first week. To date, it has sold over two million copies worldwide, and was certified Platinum in the U.S. The singles "Truth Is" and "Free Yourself" became R&B hits, reaching number two and number three respectively on the Billboard Hot R&B/Hip-Hop Songs, while the controversial "Baby Mama"—which critics accused of romanticizing single motherhood—reached the top twenty. Barrino did even better on the Billboard Hot Adult R&B Airplay, where she was the first artist of any kind to simultaneously hold the top two spots of the top three, and "Truth Is" spent 14 weeks at the number one position. Barrino was named the number-one artist of the Adult Urban Contemporary format for 2005 according to the December 13, 2005, issue of Billboard magazine.

Through the spring and winter of 2005, Barrino made many television appearances to promote her album. She played Aretha Franklin in an episode of the series American Dreams, singing "Respect", guest voiced on The Simpsons episode "A Star Is Torn", and guest starred as herself in a cameo role on the sitcom All of Us. She appeared three times as a musical guest on The Tonight Show with Jay Leno. On March 25, 2005, Barrino performed at the thirty-sixth NAACP Image Awards in honor of Illinois Senator Barack Obama after winning the award for Outstanding Female Artist. In May 2005, Barrino went on her first tour with her own live band, with soul singers Kem and Rashaan Patterson. She also appeared as a headliner at several music festivals including the Saint Lucia Jazz Festival and the Reggae Sumfest in Jamaica. In October 2005, she received good notices as an opening act for Kanye West's Touch the Sky Tour.

2006–2007: Fantasia, acting debut and Broadway 
In 2006, Barrino was nominated for three Grammy Awards for her debut album. Though she did not win any awards, she performed at the 48th annual telecast with several artists including Aerosmith, Joss Stone, John Legend, Maroon 5, and Ciara in an all-star tribute to Sly and the Family Stone during the Grammy Award show.

In August 2006, Barrino played herself in a Lifetime Television film based on her autobiography Life Is Not a Fairy Tale. The film was directed by Debbie Allen and debuted on the women's cable network on August 19, 2006. The movie received nineteen million viewers throughout its debut weekend. The Fantasia Barrino Story: Life is Not a Fairy Tale has also become Lifetime's second most viewed program of all time.

Barrino had many musical collaborations during the fall of 2006 including a remake of The Clark Sisters' "Endow Me" which featured Faith Evans, Lil' Mo, and Coko of SWV, a remake of Stevie Wonder's 1976 song "I Wish" with Patti LaBelle and Yolanda Adams for the soundtrack to the 2006 computer-animated film Happy Feet, and most notably her duet with Aretha Franklin which was recorded at that time and later released in 2007.

She released her self-titled second effort, Fantasia, on December 12, 2006. The album involved production by Missy Elliott, Swizz Beatz, Babyface, Diane Warren, and others, and has since spawned the singles "Hood Boy" produced by Tone Mason, "When I See U", and "Only One U" and went on to be certified gold.

"When I See You" became her first single to top the Hot R&B/Hip-Hop Songs chart, remaining at the number one spot for eight consecutive weeks. The single stayed on the chart for over a year and was named number eight on the Billboard Best of The 2000s R&B/Hip-Hop Songs.

In February 2007, Barrino appeared and performed on American Idol, and announced that she would be starring in the lead role of Celie in the Broadway musical The Color Purple, the hit musical based on the Pulitzer Prize-winning 1982 novel of the same name by Alice Walker. After appearing on American Idol and The Oprah Winfrey Show, the musical received a boost of over two million in pre-ticket sales in one week. Leading up to her first performance on April 10, 2007, the play garnered a total of 6.5 million in pre-ticket sales.

While playing the role, Barrino earned rave reviews for her performance. New York Post critic Clive Barnes said, "... there is some elemental quality to Barrino that is either greatness or something close to it." Upon her warm welcome to the stage Barrino was asked to perform at the 2007 Tony Awards in a tribute to Atlanta's Alliance Theater in which The Color Purple got its start. In recognition of an outstanding stage debut performance, Barrino was given the Theatre World Award and the Best Replacement Star Broadway.com Award. Barrino was initially scheduled for a limited six-month engagement ending in October 2007 but had her run extended until January 6, 2008. The Color Purple box office saw a thirty-four-million-dollar jump in sales since Barrino started in the show, a third of the play's 100 million dollar earning since its debut in 2005. The New York Post reported that Barrino missed nearly fifty performances in the show, causing the producers to give back tens of thousands of dollars in refunds. In the September 2008 issue of Sister 2 Sister magazine, Barrino revealed that the reason for her absences in The Color Purple was because of the development of a cyst on her vocal cords. She was ordered to immediately undergo surgery which later revealed that she in fact had a tumor on her vocal cords. She now reports that after a successful surgery, the tumor was completely removed and she is now well.

2008–2010: Back to Me and Fantasia for Real 
Barrino received two Grammy nominations for her sophomore release, Fantasia and subsequently began work on her third studio album in 2008. She stated on the red carpet of the 2008 Grammy Awards that the style of the new album would be a blending of the avenues she has touched musically, which include American Idol and Broadway. She also revealed that she would be writing some of the album's songs and would collaborate again with Missy Elliott, The Underdogs, and Midi Mafia, who produced one of her biggest hits, "When I See U".

Midi Mafia produced the majority of Barrino's third studio album. Also, hip hop duo Rock City were confirmed to be writing for the new project. At the time, they had recorded four songs together. She also worked with songwriter-producer Rich King which spawned two songs for her third release. KP, Eric Hudson and Raphael Saadiq are a few people that also became involved on the project. Barrino confirmed that about 75 percent of the album was complete by mid-2009, and that fans should've expected a new single by the fall of 2009, with the album due to be released in early 2010. This was later delayed, and while recording her new album, Barrino decided to do a great deal of it the "old fashioned way", inviting a live orchestra to record in the studio with her.

On March 5, 2008, Barrino confirmed to MTV News that she had been cast by Oprah Winfrey as Celie in the film adaptation of The Color Purple musical, which was set to begin production after the release of her third album.

In June 2008, Barrino parted ways with 19 Entertainment, but remained with 19 Recordings and J Records. She said that after the release of her third album, she plans to release a gospel album. She performed with her mother, Diane Barrino, in a Thanksgiving special on BET's Bobby Jones Gospel. Barrino also appeared on Jennifer Hudson's self-titled album, on the song "I'm His Only Woman", which was nominated for a 2009 Grammy Award, though it did not win.

Barrino reprised the role of Celie in the national tour of The Color Purple during its Washington D.C., Chicago, Atlanta, and Los Angeles stops.

Barrino also stars in a reality show produced by World of Wonder. Titled Fantasia for Real, it premiered on January 11, 2010, on VH1 to rave reviews and ratings. The show's first season ended in July 2010 with its second began on September 19, 2010.

"Even Angels", a song from Barrino's third studio album, produced by The Stereotypes and written by Heather Bright, was never released to radio . She performed the song on The Oprah Winfrey Show on February 3, 2010. The album's first official single, "Bittersweet", was released on May 11, 2010, and has gone on to reach number seven on the Hot R&B/Hip-Hop Songs chart as well as number seventy-four on the Billboard Hot 100.

Barrino's third studio album, Back to Me, was released on August 24, 2010. Barrino cited Tina Turner, Queen and Aretha Franklin as influences, and like musicians she admired from their era, she recorded with a live band. The album has been promoted by appearances on Good Morning America and The Wendy Williams Show among others. On March 28, 2010, Barrino also performed "America the Beautiful" at WWE WrestleMania XXVI. To promote the album, Barrino embarked on her first solo concert tour, Back to Me Tour in the fall of 2010.

Barrino appeared on the track "I Want to Be Your Man" from Charlie Wilson's album Just Charlie.

In the summer of 2010, she appeared as a guest judge alongside Wayne Brady, on episode 11 of RuPaul's Drag Race.

2011–2013: Grammy Award, return to acting, and Side Effects of You 
On February 13, 2011, Barrino won her first Grammy Award for Best Female R&B Vocal Performance for "Bittersweet".

In 2011, Barrino was cast in her first film role, playing gospel singer Mahalia Jackson in a biographical film based on the 1993 book Got to Tell It: Mahalia Jackson, Queen of Gospel. It was later reported that the film was fully endorsed by the Mahalia Jackson estate. Barrino also would receive not only the top salary in the project but a percentage of the box office revenue the film creates. Production was originally planned to begin in October 2011 in New Orleans and Chicago with a release date of late 2012 and a premiere at the Cannes Film Festival. In August 2011, organizers of the International Hair Show in Atlanta, Georgia, said medical conditions requiring bed rest had forced Barrino to cancel her scheduled performance there. After reports were released suggesting that Barrino would not be involved with the film, Double Dutch Productions LLC, the production company behind Mahalia!, released a statement saying it "extends apologies to Barrino for the inaccurate, non-factual and disparaging statements of Ms. Barrino's reputation, character and image."

In 2011, Aretha Franklin expressed interest in having Barrino play her in a planned biographical movie.

On October 7, RCA Music Group announced it was disbanding J Records along with Arista Records and Jive Records. With the shutdown, Barrino (and all other artists previously signed to these three labels) will release her future material on the RCA Records brand.

On February 13, 2012, VH1 named Barrino 32nd out of the 100 Greatest Women in Music.

Barrino was featured on a cover version of Cyndi Lauper's "True Colors" with Kelly Price and Faith Evans from Evans' compilation album R&B Divas, which was released on October 2, 2012.

On December 19, 2012, Barrino premiered her new single, "Lose to Win". During an interview on Steve Harvey's morning radio show, Barrino revealed that the album's release date would be March 13, 2013. However, on February 28, 2013, via her Facebook page, Barrino announced that her album would be released on April 23, 2013. The album was available for pre-order on March 19, 2013.

On April 19, 2013, Barrino revealed that her next single would be "Without Me", featuring Kelly Rowland and Missy Elliott.

In June 2013, Barrino embarked on a five-date tour with Andrea Bocelli. In an interview on Today in that same month, she revealed that she will return to Broadway in October 2013.

Barrino starred in the musical revue After Midnight which opened on Broadway on November 3, 2013, with previews beginning on October 18 at the Brooks Atkinson Theatre. Her role ended on February 9, 2014. She had received rave reviews from critics for her performance. New York Post wrote "... although I admired Ms. Barrino's heartfelt performance in 'The Color Purple,' I was surprised at how smoothly and intuitively she slid into the vocal persona of a jazz singer." Barrino was the first of a rotating roster of special guest stars that also included k.d. lang, Toni Braxton and Babyface. On March 20, 2014, it was announced that Barrino will return to the production for a second stint for four weeks, beginning on May 13 through June 8. Barrino performed alongside the cast and Patti LaBelle and Gladys Knight at the 68th Tony Awards.

In August 2013, Barrino co-wrote and recorded the theme song "In the Middle of the Night" for The Butler.

2014–2017: The Definition Of... and Christmas After Midnight 

On October 16, 2014, Barrino was inducted into the North Carolina Music Hall of Fame. Barrino appeared on Dave Koz's new Christmas album, December 25, which consisted of a collection of Christmas-themed duets. The album was released on September 30, 2014. In November 2014, Barrino teamed up with former Destiny's Child member Michelle Williams on the remix of Williams' "If We Had Your Eyes". In November, Barrino announced that she had started work on her next album. She posted a short clip of her and R. Kelly in the studio on her official Instagram account. "No Time for It", the first single from the album, was released on January 7, 2016. Barrino is working with music executive and producer Ron Fair.

Barrino toured with Anthony Hamilton beginning on April 21, 2016, in Buffalo, New York. The Definition Of... was released in the United States on July 29, 2016, and debuted at number six on the Billboard 200 Chart, selling 32,000 units The album also topped that week's Billboard R&B Albums Chart and was No. 2 on the Top R&B/Hip-Hop Album's chart making it Barrino's fourth top ten album. The new album featured two top 10 singles on the Adult R&B Songs airplay chart: "No Time for It", which peaked at number six, and "Sleeping with the One I Love", which peaked at number 9.

After parting ways with longtime label home RCA Records, Barrino released Christmas After Midnight on October 6, 2017, via Concord. She promoted the album by embarking on the Christmas After Midnight Tour.

2018–present: Sketchbook 
On August 31, 2018, Barrino performed at Aretha Franklin's funeral.

On February 10, 2019, she paid the tribute to Aretha Franklin at the 2019 Grammy Awards, alongside Andra Day and Yolanda Adams, and again at Aretha! A Grammy Celebration for the Queen of Soul, which was hosted by filmmaker Tyler Perry. Barrino was also a performer at Motown 60: A Grammy Celebration, which took place on April 21, 2019. She paid tribute to Mary Wells, singing "My Guy".

On March 9, 2019, Barrino revealed via her official Instagram account that her upcoming sixth studio album, Sketchbook, is complete and will feature 14 tracks. Barrino revealed that the album will include features from Meghan Trainor, T-Pain, T.I., Jazmine Sullivan and Brandy. The album's first single, "Enough" was released on May 3, 2019. The single peaked at number nine on the Billboard Adult R&B Songs chart. This marks her twelfth top ten hit on the chart.

In September 2019, Barrino recorded the theme song "Shine" for the daytime talk show Tamron Hall.

On February 3, 2022, Vanity Fair confirmed that Barrino would reprise her role as Celie in the upcoming movie musical adaptation of The Color Purple.

Personal life 
In September 2005, Barrino published a memoir, dictated to a freelance writer, titled Life Is Not a Fairy Tale. In it, she revealed she was functionally illiterate. In 2006, following the release of her autobiography, Barrino's father sued her for $10 million after she said unflattering things about him in the book that he claimed were false.

On December 9, 2008, Barrino's , lakefront home in Charlotte's Glynmoor Lakes at Piper Glen community was in foreclosure and would be up for auction. Her  home, also in Piper Glen, is unaffected. The home was due to be auctioned in January 2009 by the Mecklenburg County Sheriff's Office after the company Broward Energy Partners, which had paid over $68,000 of her taxes in 2006, said it had not been fully repaid. The auction earnings were to be used to finish reimbursing the company for the loan, on which Barrino had paid back $10,000. The auction was canceled after Barrino's attorneys and the lender reached an "eleventh-hour deal", the details of which were not disclosed.

She dated former NFL player Michael Clayton, who was at the time playing for the Tampa Bay Buccaneers.

An August 2010 divorce filing in Mecklenburg County District Court alleges that Barrino had a year-long relationship with Antwaun Cook, who was married, bringing up the subject of alienation of affection laws in North Carolina. Barrino claimed the two began dating after Cook and his wife separated. In December 2010, a North Carolina judge ruled in Barrino's favor, stating the Cooks' separation date was September 14, 2009, and not June 2010 as Paula previously claimed.

On August 9, 2010, Barrino was hospitalized in Pineville, North Carolina, due to overdosing on aspirin and an unknown sleep aid.

In December 2011 she gave birth to a son.

On July 18, 2015, she married Kendall Taylor, a businessman.

In 2019, Barrino came under fire when, in an interview on The Breakfast Club radio show, she claimed that women were not to lead their household and that the reason so many women were single is because they're trying to be the leader of a relationship, a position that should fall to the man, calling it a "generational curse" and saying women should submit to their male partners.

In November 2020, Barrino revealed that she was expecting her first child with husband Kendall Taylor. In May 2021, she gave birth to a daughter.

On November 29, 2022, Sigma Gamma Rho sorority announced that Barrino was inducted as an honorary member of their sorority.

Artistry

Voice 
Barrino's voice has been described as raspy, gritty and soulful just like that of Tina Turner.

Influences 
Barrino has said from childhood she has been influenced by soul singers Aretha Franklin, Patti LaBelle, Chaka Khan and Tina Turner, as well as jazz singers Billie Holiday, Ella Fitzgerald, Cab Calloway and Nina Simone. Barrino has drawn many comparisons to her idols. LaBelle affectionately calls Barrino "baby Patti". "[Fantasia's] just a baby me...when you see yourself in someone else, you say, 'God I'm 70, she's 30,' so she's like the Patti Labelle from back in the day and everything and she's so raw", LaBelle stated in an interview. She always credit her church upbringing and cites The Clark Sisters as one of her influences. Barrino is also an admirer of rock music and was influenced by Queen and Elton John. Her fourth album, Side Effects of You introduced a new and much edgier rock-inspired sound which she coined as 'rock soul'. During an interview with Billboard.com, Barrino has stated that she would like to go in more of a rock direction for her fifth studio album. "This whole rock soul direction has been on my heart. I'll always be soulful: I started singing in the church at the age of five. So that will never go anywhere. But there's a certain side of me that wants to tap into that whole rock world. It's hard to come from R&B to that. But it's something I believe in and will fight for", Barrino said in the interview.

Genres 
Barrino's music is mostly contemporary R&B, heavily rooted in soul music and gospel music. Her lyrics speak of love, pain and resilience. She also incorporates pop, funk, reggae and hip hop into her music. Side Effects of You demonstrated the versatility of Barrino's voice. Barrino introduced a new and much edgier rock-inspired sound which she coined as 'rock soul'. Gerrick D. Kennedy  from the Los Angeles Times praised the album as "sumptuous contemporary R&B dipped in vintage rock and soul". Andy Kellman from Allmusic called it "her finest album yet". Barrino further showcased her versatility and expanded her range while starring in Broadway musicals The Color Purple and After Midnight, as well as her mini-tour with Italian tenor Andrea Bocelli.

Achievements 

Since winning American Idol in 2004, Barrino has sold over three million records and won numerous awards and accolades, including a Grammy Award, three Billboard Awards, three NAACP Image Awards and two ASCAP Awards. Her first single, "I Believe", debuted on the Billboard Hot 100 at number-one, making Barrino the first artist in history to achieve this with a debut single. In 2005, Barrino was named the number-one artist of the Adult Urban Contemporary format, according to the December 13, 2005, issue of Billboard magazine. In 2012, VH1 ranked her number 32 out of the 100 Greatest Women in Music. Barrino was the first artist of any kind to simultaneously hold the top two spots of the top three on the Billboard Hot Adult R&B Airplay. Her song, "Truth Is" spent fourteen weeks at the number-one position. Barrino's American Idol performance of the Porgy and Bess standard "Summertime" was named amongst the AOL's 2004 list of greatest television moments.

Impact 
Over the course of her career, Barrino has inspired other artists, including American Idol season eleven contestant Joshua Ledet who was dubbed "Mantasia" by fans, the media and even Barrino herself. Actress Amber Riley revealed her admiration for Barrino in an interview on The Arsenio Hall Show and cited her as an "inspiration". In 2017, filmmaker Tyler Perry referred to Barrino as one of the greatest singers of all time during Barrino's concert in Atlanta.

Discography 

Free Yourself (2004)
Fantasia (2006)
Back to Me (2010)
Side Effects of You (2013)
The Definition of... (2016)
Christmas After Midnight (2017)
Sketchbook (2019)

Credits

Films

Television

Stage

Bibliography 
Life Is Not a Fairy Tale (2005)

Tours 
Headlining
2010–11: Back to Me Tour
2013: Side Effects of You Tour
2016: The Definition Of... Tour
2017: Christmas After Midnight Tour
2019: The Sketchbook Tour

Co-headlining
2004: American Idols LIVE! Tour 2004 
2005: Find Your Way Tour 
2016: Fantasia & Anthony Hamilton: Live in Concert 
2016: Annual Summer Jam 

Opening act
2005: Touch the Sky Tour 
2006: Unpredictable Tour 
2011: Intimacy Tour 
2013: 2013 World Tour 
2017: In It to Win It Tour

See also 
List of Idols winners

References

External links 

 
 
 

 
1984 births
African-American women singers
American Idol winners
American performers of Christian music
American women pop singers
American soul singers
American women hip hop musicians
American women hip hop singers
Grammy Award winners
Living people
Singers from North Carolina
People from High Point, North Carolina
J Records artists
RCA Records artists
19 Recordings artists
Participants in American reality television series
American memoirists
American women memoirists
African-American non-fiction writers
American non-fiction writers
21st-century American singers
African-American actresses
American television actresses
American film actresses
American voice actresses
American musical theatre actresses
American stage actresses
American contemporary R&B singers
21st-century American women singers
Theatre World Award winners